Anna Saraeva (born 1 November 1978) is a retired Russian judoka who competed in the 2000 Summer Olympics.

References

1978 births
Living people
Russian female judoka
Olympic judoka of Russia
Judoka at the 2000 Summer Olympics
Sportspeople from Samara, Russia
Universiade medalists in judo
Universiade bronze medalists for Russia
21st-century Russian women